Shan Hong (born 10 February 1967) is a Chinese sport shooter who competed in the 2000 Summer Olympics.

References

1967 births
Living people
Chinese female sport shooters
ISSF rifle shooters
Olympic shooters of China
Shooters at the 2000 Summer Olympics
Shooters at the 1998 Asian Games
Shooters at the 2002 Asian Games
Asian Games medalists in shooting
World record holders in shooting
Place of birth missing (living people)
Asian Games gold medalists for China
Asian Games silver medalists for China
Asian Games bronze medalists for China
Medalists at the 1998 Asian Games
Medalists at the 2002 Asian Games
Sport shooters from Henan
21st-century Chinese women